Sphaeridium quinquemaculatum, is a species of water scavenger beetle found in India, China, Indonesia, Nepal, Sri Lanka, Laos, Thailand and the Philippines.

References 

Hydrophilidae
Insects of Sri Lanka
Beetles described in 1798